Ludmilla "Luma" von Flesch-Brunningen  (1856-1934) was a Czech artist.

Biography 
Flesch-Brunningen née  was born on 31 March 1856 in Brünn (now Brno, Czech Republic). She studied in Vienna, Austria and Munich, Germany. She exhibited her work at the 1900 Paris Exposition. Flesch-Brunningen died in 1934 in Munich.

Gallery

References

1856 births
1934 deaths
Artists from Brno
19th-century women artists
20th-century Czech women artists